The 2000 Plaid Cymru leadership election was held following the resignation on health grounds of Dafydd Wigley.

Wigley had led the party since 1991 and saw them make a surprise breakthrough in the 1999 Assembly elections winning 17 seats and almost a third of the popular vote.

The role of leader, at this point, was combined with the role of Party President.

Three candidates stood. MEP for Wales Jill Evans, Ynys Mon AM and MP Ieuan Wyn Jones and Llanelli AM Helen Mary Jones

The contest was won by Ieuan Wyn Jones with 77.6% of the vote in the first round.

Results

References

2000
2000 elections in the United Kingdom
2000 in Wales
2000s elections in Wales
Plaid Cymru leadership election